is a retired Japanese gymnast. She competed in all artistic gymnastics events at the 1960 and 1964 Olympics and won a team bronze medal in 1964. Her best individual achievements were fourth places on the vault and uneven bars in 1964. Born Toshiko Shirasu she changed her last name after marrying Nobuyuki Aihara, a fellow Olympic gymnast. Their son Yutaka Aihara won a bronze medal in gymnastics at the 1992 Olympics.

References

External links

 
 

1939 births
Living people
Japanese female artistic gymnasts
Olympic gymnasts of Japan
Gymnasts at the 1960 Summer Olympics
Gymnasts at the 1964 Summer Olympics
Olympic bronze medalists for Japan
Olympic medalists in gymnastics
Medalists at the 1964 Summer Olympics
Medalists at the World Artistic Gymnastics Championships
20th-century Japanese women